Kingsley Boateng (born 7 April 1994) is a Ghanaian-born Italian professional footballer who plays as a winger.

Club career 
Boateng began his professional football career with Milan in 2013, and in the 2013–14 season Boateng was loaned to Catania in Serie A and he made his professional debut for the club in Serie A in a 0–0 draw against Parma at Stadio Angelo Massimino on 22 September 2013.

On 3 July 2014, it was announced that Boateng had signed a three-year deal with Dutch side NAC Breda of the Eredivisie. He signed on a free transfer from Milan.

On 13 January 2015, Boateng was sold to Serie B side Bari.

On 9 January 2017, he moved to Slovenian club  Olimpija Ljubljana. In 2018 he won both the Slovenian league and the Slovenian cup with Olimpija.

On 4 February 2019, Boateng signed with Italian club Ternana.

On 24 August 2019, he joined Juve Stabia on loan with an option to purchase. On 31 January 2020, he moved on loan to Siena. On 16 September 2020 he was loaned to Fermana. On 9 July 2021 the loan to Fermana was renewed for the 2021–22 season.

International career
Boateng has been capped by Italy at under-18 level and under-21 level but remains eligible to represent Ghana at senior level.

Career statistics

Club

Honours

Club 
Olimpija Ljubljana
Slovenian PrvaLiga: 2017–18
Slovenian Cup: 2017–18

References

External links
 Kingsley Boateng at Sky Sports

1994 births
Living people
People from Ashanti Region
Italian people of Ghanaian descent
Italian sportspeople of African descent
Ghanaian footballers
Italian footballers
Association football wingers
Association football forwards
Serie A players
Serie B players
Serie C players
A.C. Milan players
Catania S.S.D. players
S.S.C. Bari players
Ternana Calcio players
S.S. Juve Stabia players
A.C.N. Siena 1904 players
Fermana F.C. players
Eredivisie players
NAC Breda players
Slovenian PrvaLiga players
NK Olimpija Ljubljana (2005) players
Italian expatriate footballers
Italian expatriate sportspeople in the Netherlands
Italian expatriate sportspeople in Slovenia
Expatriate footballers in the Netherlands
Expatriate footballers in Slovenia
Italy youth international footballers
Italy under-21 international footballers